Frecheville Community Association Football Club was a football club based in Frecheville, Sheffield, South Yorkshire.

History
The club first came to prominence when they won the Hatchard League title in 1966, following this up with a Sheffield Association League win in 1968 – the same season they first entered the FA Amateur Cup.

After winning the Association League they joined the Yorkshire League, winning promotion from Division Two to Division One in their first season.  They won the Sheffield & Hallamshire Senior Cup in 1973–74 and finished as Yorkshire League runners-up in 1974–75. A year later they finished bottom of the league, being relegated back to Division Two, but they did not stay out of the top flight for long, winning promotion back to Division One at the first time of asking. During the same 1976–77 season they made their FA Cup debut, but lost to Winterton Rangers in the preliminary round at Silkstone Road. A year later they reached the Quarter-final of the FA Vase.

In 1982 the Yorkshire League merged with the Midland League to form the Northern Counties East League (NCEL), and Frecheville were entered into Division One South of the new competition. When the league was reorganised in 1985, the club was placed in Division Two, which it won in 1986–87, gaining promotion to Division One. After three seasons in the top division, the club left the NCEL to join the more local Sheffield & Hallamshire County Senior League (S&HCSL), entering at the S&HCSL's second tier, Division One.

Frecheville were crowned champions of Division One in 1991–92 and were promoted to the Premier Division. In their first season in the S&HCSL's top flight, the club won the league title, an achievement they repeated two years later. In 2002, just a year after finishing as runners-up, they were relegated to Division One when finishing bottom of the league, and in 2009 they were relegated again, to Division Two. They won the Division Two title at the first time of asking, and were promoted back to the Premier Division in 2012.

In 2016, they won their third S&HCSL title, but a year later the club was effectively disbanded when it moved to the Davys Sports Club and twice changed its name, first to Frecheville-Davys, and later to just Davys. A new Frecheville Community Association was formed in 2019, but lasted only the duration of the shortened 2019-20 season before disbanding again.

Season-by-season record

Notable former players
Players that have played in the Football League either before or after playing for the club –

  Ian Bowling
  Steve Thompson

Ground
The club plays at the Davy Sports & Social Club in Sheffield.

Honours

League
Yorkshire League Division Two
Promoted: 1968–69, 1976–77
Northern Counties East League Division Two
Promoted: 1986–87 (champions)
Sheffield Association League
Champions: 1967–68
Sheffield & Hallamshire County Senior League Premier Division
Champions: 1992–93, 1994–95, 2015–16
Sheffield & Hallamshire County Senior League Division One
Promoted: 1991–92 (champions), 2011–12
Sheffield & Hallamshire County Senior League Division Two
Promoted: 2009–10 (champions)
Hatchard League
Champions: 1965–66

Cup
Sheffield & Hallamshire Senior Cup
Winners: 1973–74
Runners-up: 1971–72, 1983–84
Sheffield & Hallamshire County Senior League Cup
Winners: 1992–93, 1998–99, 1999–00

Records
Best FA Cup performance: Preliminary Round, 1976–77
Best FA Amateur Cup performance: 4th Qualifying Round, 1969–70
Best FA Vase performance: Quarter-final, 1977–78

References

Football clubs in England
Football clubs in South Yorkshire
Sheffield & Hallamshire County FA members
Hatchard League
Sheffield Association League
Yorkshire Football League
Northern Counties East Football League
Sheffield & Hallamshire County Senior Football League
Defunct football clubs in England
Defunct football clubs in South Yorkshire
2018 disestablishments in England